Zhang Zhiqiang (born 4 September 1988) is a Chinese short track speed skater.

His career is marked with a victory in a 1000 m race during the 2007-08 World Cup as well as three team podiums.

External links
 Athlete's statistics
 Person Bio

1988 births
Living people
Chinese male short track speed skaters
Universiade medalists in short track speed skating
Medalists at the 2009 Winter Universiade
21st-century Chinese people
Universiade gold medalists for China